Kassow is a municipality in Germany.

Kassow may also refer to:

 Ole Kassow (rower) (born 1935), Danish rower
 Ole Kassow (social entrepreneur) (born 1966), Danish social entrepreneur
 Samuel Kassow (born 1946), American historian

See also
 Kassowal, Pakistan